The Gun Hill Road station is a station on the IRT Dyre Avenue Line of the New York City Subway, located at the intersection of Gun Hill Road and Seymour Avenue in the northeast Bronx. It is served by the 5 train at all times.

History

Early history 

Gun Hill Road station opened on May 29, 1912 as a local station of the New York, Westchester and Boston Railway (NYW&B). This station was closed on December 12, 1937 when the NYW&B went bankrupt.

The New York City Board of Transportation (BOT) bought the NYW&B within the Bronx north of East 180th Street in April 1940 for $1.8 million and rehabilitated the line. On May 15, 1941, a shuttle service was implemented between Dyre Avenue and East 180th Street using IRT gate cars. The Dyre Avenue Line was connected directly to the White Plains Road Line north of East 180th Street for $3 million and through service began on May 6, 1957.

On February 27, 1962, the New York City Transit Authority announced a $700,000 modernization plan of the Dyre Avenue Line. At the time, the line was served by 9-car trains during the day, and 3-car shuttles overnight. Between 1954 and 1961, ridership on the line increased by 100 percent, owing to the development of the northeast Bronx.

On April 18, 1965, IRT Broadway–Seventh Avenue Line trains and IRT Lexington Avenue Line trains swapped their northern routings, with Broadway–Seventh Avenue 2 trains running via the IRT White Plains Road Line to 241st Street, and Lexington Avenue 5 trains running via the Dyre Avenue Line to Dyre Avenue.

Station renovation 
As part of the 2015–2019 MTA Capital Program, elevators were added to the platforms and street, which makes the station fully compliant with accessibility guidelines under the Americans with Disabilities Act of 1990. A contract for the elevators' construction was awarded in April 2018. Substantial completion was projected for July 2020, but was pushed back to September 2020, and eventually past September 2020. In conjunction with this work, the Eastchester-bound platform was closed from March 1, 2019 to September 6, 2019, while the Manhattan-bound platform was closed from September 13, 2019 to March 30, 2020, a month later than expected. The elevators opened six months behind schedule in January 2021.

Station layout 

This station has two side platforms with three tracks and space for a fourth. The street (Gun Hill Road) is above the northern part of the station.

The entrance is at street level. At the north end of the station, it is in an open-cut due to the rising terrain. At the south end of the station, it is at-grade.

Exit
The station's only entrance/exit is a head house on the south side of Gun Hill Road between Sexton and Dewitt Places. The entrance and exit are separate from each other within the headhouse. One staircase and elevator leads down to the southbound platform, while two staircases and an elevator leads down to the northbound platform. There was once an exit that only allowed passengers to leave the station from the northbound platform, but during the station renovations that includes elevator installations to each platform, that exit has since been closed and the staircase was reconfigured to connect itself to the mezzanine inside fare control.

References

External links 

 
 Station Reporter — 5 Train
 The Subway Nut — Gun Hill Road Pictures 
 Gun Hill Road entrance from Google Maps Street View
Platforms from Google Maps Street View

IRT Dyre Avenue Line stations
New York City Subway stations in the Bronx
Railway stations in the United States opened in 1912
Railway stations in the United States opened in 1941
1912 establishments in New York City